Matthew Wright (born 30 January 1991) is a Samoa international rugby league footballer who plays as a  and  for the Newcastle Thunder in Betfred Championship.  

He previously played for the Cronulla-Sutherland Sharks, North Queensland Cowboys and the Manly-Warringah Sea Eagles in the NRL and the Central Queensland Capras in the Intrust Super Cup.

Early career
Born in Auckland, New Zealand, Wright grew up in Blacktown, New South Wales, playing his junior rugby league for St Patrick's and attending Patrician Brothers' College. While attending Patrician Brothers', Wright was a member of their rugby league team that was defeated by Matraville High in the final of 2007 GIO Schoolboy Cup. In 2008, Wright was selected to play for the Australian Schoolboys.

A Penrith Panthers junior, Wright played for the Panther's Harold Matthews Cup and S.G. Ball Cup sides, winning the Harold Matthews Player of the Year award in 2007. In 2008, Wright debuted for Penrith's NYC team. In 10 games, he scored six tries and kicked 28 goals. That year he signed a three-year deal with the Cronulla Sharks.

Playing career

2009
After starting the 2009 season in the NYC, Wright made his first grade debut for the Sharks at just 18 years old. In his rookie season, Wright played 17 games and scored 6 tries.

2010
Wright spent the 2010 season playing for Cronulla's NYC and NSW Cup sides. At the end of the season, Wright played two games for the Junior Kangaroos, and was selected in Samoa's train-on squad.

2011
In 2011, Wright returned to first grade for the Sharks, playing 19 games all on the wing and scoring 4 tries.

2012
Wright spent the majority of 2012 playing fullback for Cronulla, scoring 1 try.

2013
In 2013, he made his test debut for Samoa in the Pacific Rugby League International against Tonga.

Later that season, Wright was a member of the Sharks victorious New South Wales Cup side.

2014
In January 2014, Wright signed a one-year deal with the North Queensland Cowboys. Wright made his debut for the Cowboys in their Round 5 win over the Newcastle Knights, in which he scored a try. On 22 August, Wright became one of the current NRL players and former Sharks players to accept reduced bans from the Australian Sports Anti-Doping Authority for his role in the club's 2011 supplements program.

Wright finished his first season for the Cowboys with 9 tries in 17 games, including a first half hat-trick in the side's 64–6 win over the Wests Tigers.

2015
In Round 5 of the 2015 NRL season, Wright scored his second hat-trick for the Cowboys in their 30–10 win over the Penrith Panthers.

2016
On 22 April, Wright was granted a release from the Cowboys to join the Manly Warringah Sea Eagles on a three-year contract. On 7 May 2016, Wright played for Samoa in the 2016 Polynesian Cup against Tonga, where he played on the wing and scored a try in the 18–6 win at Parramatta Stadium. Later in the year he represented Samoa in their historical test match against Fiji in Apia. He kicked 3 goals in Samoa's two point defeat.

2019
On 9 Jun 2019, Newcastle Thunder announced the signing of Wright

Statistics

NRL
 Statistics are correct to Round 26 of the 2016 season

International

Personal life
Wright is the nephew of former New Zealand international Tony Tatupu and Wests Tigers back Tim Simona (despite actually being almost 10 months older than Simona). He is also a cousin of Cronulla-Sutherland Sharks forward Jesse Sene-Lefao and Canterbury-Bankstown Bulldogs forward Lamar Liolevave.

References

External links

Manly Sea Eagles profile
Sea Eagles profile
North Queensland Cowboys profile
2017 RLWC profile

1991 births
Living people
Cronulla-Sutherland Sharks players
Doping cases in rugby league
Junior Kangaroos players
Mackay Cutters players
Manly Warringah Sea Eagles players
New Zealand emigrants to Australia
New Zealand rugby league players
New Zealand sportspeople of Samoan descent
New Zealand people of Tokelauan descent
Newcastle Thunder players
North Queensland Cowboys players
NRL All Stars players
Northern Pride RLFC players
Rugby league centres
Rugby league fullbacks
Rugby league wingers
Rugby league players from Auckland
Samoa national rugby league team players